Ampasambazimba is a mountain peak and subfossil site in Madagascar, near Analavory, (Itasy) most known for being the site of the remains of the extinct giant sloth lemur Archaeoindris.

Ampasambazimba is located at 1,036 meters above sea level. It was discovered in 1902 by Monsieur Raybaud, a colonial administrator at the time. In 1909, the giant sloth lemur Archaeoindris was described by Herbert F. Standing using subfossil fragments. A complete skull was later discovered by Charles Lamberton in 1925, which he then published in 1934.

Ampasambazimba is regarded as one of the most productive and most well-known subfossil sites in Madagascar. A number of sporadic excavations were conducted at Ampasambazimba, ranging from 1902 to 1984. Excavations resulted in the discovery of 15 lemuroid species, of which seven were extinct. Excavations also resulted in the discovery of 13 bird species, of which eight were extinct.

History

Prehistoric 

Radiocarbon dating suggests lemuroid species were living on Ampasambazimba over 22,000 years ago. The dating also showed that tree specimens had existed over 8,000 years ago. It has been believed that the giant sloth lemur Archaeoindris had been living when humans first set foot on Madagascar at approximately 350 BC. Subfossil evidence suggested that Megaladapis grandidieri was the last extant lemuroid species, with the subfossil sample being dated 900–1040 AD. Birds and eagles, including Stephanoaetus mahery, were also thought to have been living at Ampasambazimba over 5,500 years ago.

Prior to human arrival, Ampasambazimba was thought to have been a more open habitat, rather than a completely forested area. It consisted of a mix of woodlands, bushlands, and savanna.

Discovery 
In 1902, Monsieur Raybaud, a colonial administrator, discovered Ampasambazimba and constructed a report to then-President of France Émile Loubet. This prompted a number of sporadic excavations, ranging from 1902 to 1984. Excavations unearthed an "enormous amount of bone material". 15 lemur species, including Archaeoindris and Megaladapis, were unearthed; seven were extinct. 13 bird species, including Stephanoeatus mahery, were also unearthed; eight were extinct.

References

Sources
 
 
 
 

Mountains of Madagascar
Subfossil lemurs